The 15th Illinois Infantry Regimenty was an infantry regiment that served in the Union Army during the American Civil War.

Service
The 15th Illinois Infantry Volunteer Regiment was raised under the 10 Regiment Act. The 15th Illinois Infantry was mustered at Freeport, Illinois, on May 24, 1861.

Companies A, D, and F were made from volunteers from McHenry County, Company B was made by volunteers from Boone County, Company C was from Winnebago County, Company E hailed from Jo Daviess County, Company G came from Stephenson County, Company H was from Ogle County, Company I was from Lake County, and Company K was from Carroll County.

The 15 and 14th Illinois participated together in movements around Rolla Mo. ahead of the Fort Donelson Campaign. By the completion of the Donelson Campaign, with General US Grant in command, the 14th and 15th Illinois were part of General Steven A. Hurlbut's 4th 'Fighting Fourth' Division and assigned a camp near the Union left wing at Pittsburgh Landing.  Both regiments were brigaded under the command of  Colonel James C. Veatch, and ordered to decamp and move out to support the heavily pressed General Sherman on the right wing.  Anecdotal memoir by Sgt. Moses Gleason Montgomery describe heavy fighting at the Hornet's Nest before proceeding on to their defensive position supporting the retreat of the right wing.

Sgt Montgomery was shot in the chest during this engagement, and describes his survival that night by a 'Blessed rain'. On the second Day of battle at Shiloh, General Grant took direct command of the 14th and 15th Illinois in the counter attack against P.G.T. Beauregard.

After the engagement, General Grant directed that the 14th and 15th Illinois volunteer regiments would remain together for the duration of the Civil War.

As a result of combined losses to both regiments, and since both units refused to receive new recruits, the regiment was consolidated with the 14th Regiment Illinois Volunteer Infantry to form the 14th and 15th Illinois Battalion Infantry on July 1, 1864, and was finally  mustered out of service on September 16, 1865, at Fort Leavenworth.

Total strength and casualties
The regiment suffered 6 officers and 81 enlisted men who were killed in action or who died of their wounds and 5 officers and 135 enlisted men who died of disease, for a total of 227 fatalities.

Commanders
Colonel Thomas J. Turner – Regiment resigned November 2, 1862.
Colonel George Clark Rogers

See also
List of Illinois Civil War Units
Illinois in the American Civil War

Notes

References
The Civil War Archive

Units and formations of the Union Army from Illinois
1861 establishments in Illinois
Military units and formations established in 1861
Military units and formations disestablished in 1865